Route 115 is a  numbered state highway is the U.S. state of Rhode Island. Its western terminus is at Route 116 in Hope and its eastern terminus is at Route 117 in Warwick.

Route description
Route 115 takes the following route through Rhode Island:

Scituate: ; Route 116 to Cranston city line
Main Street, Jackson Flat Road and Main Street
Cranston: ; Scituate town line to Coventry town line
Main Street
Coventry: ; Cranston city line to West Warwick town line
Main Street
West Warwick: ; Coventry town line to Warwick city line
Main Street, [Main Street, Pike Street] (East Main Street), East Main Street and Providence Street
Warwick: ; West Warwick town line to Route 117
Toll Gate Road

History
Toll Gate Road is named such because it used to be a connector road to a toll gate for the old New London Turnpike.

Major intersections

Notes

From the point where Providence Street intersects New London Avenue to the turn onto Toll Gate Road, Route 115 runs on the Warwick/West Warwick town line with Route 115 Eastbound running in Warwick and Route 115 Westbound running in West Warwick.

References

External links

2019 Highway Map, Rhode Island

115
Transportation in Providence County, Rhode Island
Transportation in Kent County, Rhode Island
Scituate, Rhode Island
Coventry, Rhode Island
Cranston, Rhode Island
Warwick, Rhode Island
West Warwick, Rhode Island